Cartennae or Cartenna was an ancient Berber, Carthaginian, and Roman port at present-day Ténès, Algeria. Under the Romans, it was part of the province of Mauretania Caesariensis.

Name

Cartenna's name was variously recorded by the Greeks as Karténna, Kártina, Kártinna, and Karténnai. It was usually Latinized as Cartennae or Cartenna, but appears as Cartinna in Mela. These names seem to combine the Punic word for "city" with a Berber placename element, also seen in the Phoenician names for Cirta, Tipasa, and Sabratha. The name does not derive from the river but from nearby Cape Tenes. Notionally refounded as a Roman colony, it was also known as  after its imperial patron.

History

Phoenician colony
Cartennae was established as a Phoenician colony by the 8th centuryBC. It lay at the mouth of the Wadi Allala (the classical Cartennus). In addition to trading in the usual ivory, hides, and cedar of the interior, Cartennae was apparently the site of an important copper mine. Like other colonies in the western Mediterranean, Cartennae eventually fell under Carthaginian control.

Roman colony
After the Punic Wars, Cartennae was dominated by the Romans. The first emperor Augustus established a colony of veterans from the 2nd Legion there in 30BC and the city started to grow in importance. Augustus even founded in what is now coastal Algeria the following Roman colonies: Igilgili, Saldae, Tubusuctu, Rusazu, Rusguniae, Aquae Calidae, Zuccabar and Gunugu. All these colonies were connected to Cartennae in a military way with strong commercial links.

During the centuries of Roman domination Cartennae was a rich city with a forum, theater, baths, library and aqueducts, but it was devastated during the revolt of Firmus in the years 372–375.

Despite the continuation of its name in modern Ténès, identification of the site was long delayed by misinformation in surviving geographical accounts of Roman North Africa, including Ptolemy the Antonine Itineraries. Distances in the gazetteers were apparently thrown off by Ptolemy's misreckoning of longitude and by the lack of Roman roads in the area, requiring distances to be estimated by sailors. The French first confused Cartennae with Mostaganem,  to the west, but the discovery of epitaphs a few years later in Ténès helped solve the mistake. A necropolis has been excavated and formerly served as a public park.

Later history

Cartennae was sacked by the Vandals during their 5th-century invasion of Roman North Africa and presumably reconquered by the Byzantines during their resumption of control over the area. It was almost entirely destroyed following the conquest of the area by the Umayyad Caliphate.

Following the town's surrender to the invading French in 1843, the former site of Cartennae became the center of the new French town established in 1847.

Religion

Cartennae was a Christian bishopric in antiquity and the early medieval period and was reëstablished as a Catholic titular see in the 20th century.

The earliest known bishops of Cartennae were Rogatus and Vincentius, who espoused the schismatic or heretical belief ("Rogatism") that the church should not use force to compel orthodox belief, particularly against the Donatists; their arguments survive only in the form of StAugustine's invective against them. Other known bishops are Rusticus, who in 418 assisted at the disputation between Saint Augustine and the Donatist Emeritus in Caesarea in Mauretania; Victor, a contemporary of Genseric (and therefore of the mid-5th century) and the author of several works; and Lucidus, one of the Catholic bishops whom Huneric summoned to Carthage in 484 and then exiled.

References

Citations

Bibliography
 .
 .
 .
 
 .
 .
 .
 .
 .
 
 .

See also

 Mauretania Caesariensis
 Caesarea of Mauretania

Phoenician colonies in Algeria
Archaeological sites in Algeria
Roman towns and cities in Mauretania Caesariensis
Ancient Berber cities
Populated places established in the 1st millennium BC
8th-century BC establishments
1st-millennium BC establishments